Bhabesh Chandra Nandi was a representative of East Pakistan in the Constituent Assembly of Pakistan.

In 1950, Nandi was elected to the East Bengal Provincial Assembly on a Pakistan National Congress ticket from the East Dacca constituency, after the incumbent MLA Ganendra Chandra Bhattacharjee (from Congress) migrated to India. He was a member of the Constituent Assembly of Pakistan.

Notes

References

Pakistani MNAs 1947–1954
Living people
Year of birth missing (living people)
Members of the Constituent Assembly of Pakistan